Cuauhtémoc Gutiérrez de la Torre (born 16 May 1968) is a Mexican lawyer, politician and former waste picker leader from the Institutional Revolutionary Party . From 2010 to 2012 he served as Deputy of the LXI Legislature of the Mexican Congress representing the Federal District and from 2012 to 2014 he served as Chairman of the Institutional Revolutionary Party in Mexico City. He is on a temporary leave of absence due to charges of using public resources and facilities to operate a prostitution ring; the prostitution ring allegations were the result of an investigative journalism investigation that included the testimony of 5 women and undercover recordings of a journalist.

Notes to the aforementioned information:

 Within hours of the prostitution ring allegations were made public, Gutierrez de la Torre denied the accusations, but the evidence was so strong that he was separated by the PRI as their party president for the Mexico City chapter.
 The allegations were never followed or investigated by the Mexico City D.A. and the case went stale for years; in September 2020, the Mexico City Head Prosecutor, informed the country that the case will be re-visited as they have uncovered sound evidence to re-open the investigation and have suggested that the former D.A. officials incurred in grave omissions during past investigations. 
 The PRI Mexico City had to pay a settlement to three women who were hired directly by Gutierrez de La Torre in 2002 and dismissed in 2003 after refusing to have sexual relations with him. The three women took the case to the Labour Courts in Mexico City and although the process took almost 10 years, there was enough documental evidence to confirm the working relationship of the women to the PRI Mexico City and the handsome Gutierrez de La Torre. in November 2011, The PRI Mexico City reached an agreement with the three women to finalise the matter. (It is noted that the demand was for unjustified and illegal dismissal only, as the women refused to have sexual encounters with Gutierrez de La Torre).
 At the time of the accusations, Gutierrez de La Torre had three ″madam recruiters″ who also served as filters for the hiring of young women to provide sexual services to the PRI president in Mexico City. The first was Adriana Rodriguez, then Claudia Pricilla Martinez Gonzalez, and the final filter was his personal secretary was Sandra Esther Vaca Cortes.

The first two women have disappeared of the public life, but Sandra Esther Vaca Cortes is still part of Mexico's political life and became a local deputy in June 2018 (member of the Congress of Mexico City) and was publicly supported by the PRI's National President Claudia Ruiz Massieu during a work session in September 2018.

Gutiérrez de la Torre]] was charged with attempted sexual exploitation, false advertising, and criminal conspiracy on March 9, 2021. It is unclear whether the arrest is related to the 2014 accusations.

References

1968 births
Living people
Politicians from Mexico City
20th-century Mexican lawyers
Members of the Chamber of Deputies (Mexico) for Mexico City
Institutional Revolutionary Party politicians
21st-century Mexican politicians
Deputies of the LXI Legislature of Mexico